West Lake Cultural Square is an interchange station between Line 1, Line 3 and Line 19 of Hangzhou Metro in China. It was opened in November 2012, together with the rest of the stations on Line 1. It is located at Xihuwenhua Square in Gongshu District of Hangzhou. The station is designed to accommodate a paired cross-platform interchange with Line 3.

Station structure
A same-direction cross-platform interchange is provided between Line 1 and Line 3.

Lines 1 & 3 platform layout
Island Platform on B2

Island Platform on B3

References

Railway stations in Zhejiang
Railway stations in China opened in 2012
Hangzhou Metro stations